This is a list of electoral results for the North Western Province in Victorian state elections.

Members for North Western Province

Election results

Elections in the 2000s

Elections in the 1990s

Elections in the 1980s

Elections in the 1970s

 Two candidate preferred vote was estimated.

Elections in the 1960s

 Two party preferred vote was estimated.

 Two party preferred vote was estimated.

 Two party preferred vote was estimated.

Elections in the 1950s

References

Victoria (Australia) state electoral results by district